Only Connect is a British television quiz show presented by Victoria Coren Mitchell. In the series, teams compete in a tournament of finding connections between seemingly unrelated clues. The title is taken from a passage in E. M. Forster's 1910 novel Howards End: "Only connect the prose and the passion, and both will be exalted".

Only Connect aired on BBC Four from 15 September 2008 to 7 July 2014, before moving to BBC Two from 1 September 2014. From 2008 until 2013 the show was recorded in Studio 1 at the ITV Wales Studios based at Culverhouse Cross in Cardiff, which have now been demolished. It moved temporarily to Roath Lock Studios in Cardiff in late 2013, before settling in Enfys Studios in Cardiff from 2014 onwards.

The series is regularly the most watched programme on BBC Two of the week and is typically broadcast on Mondays between Mastermind and University Challenge as part of the channel's quiz night.

Format 

Only Connect is deliberately difficult, and its contestants are often characterized – including within the show itself – as nerdy or geeky. Teams are encouraged to take names which reflect specialist interests or hobbies, such as the 'LARPers' or 'Francophiles'. The show's questions will cover any topic, and many may require knowledge of both arcane subject areas and popular culture. Questions may also be self-referential, or based on linguistic or numeric tricks, rather than requiring any particular factual knowledge. When presented with the clues, contestants are not told the type of the connection, and as such part of the gameplay involves establishing whether the connection is thematic, linguistic, factual, mathematical, etc. Coren Mitchell's presenting includes very dry, sarcastic humour, which may include a gentle mocking of herself, the contestants, the viewers, the show's production team, celebrities, or other popular quizzes, and often Michael Portillo.

Each programme has two teams of three people competing in four rounds of gameplay. Before the show, a coin toss is conducted to determine the order of play, with the winner deciding to either play first in Rounds 1 and 2, or pass to their opponent and play first in Round 3. In the first three series, clues in Rounds 1 and 2 and the connecting walls in Round 3 were identified by Greek letters. In series 4 Coren Mitchell announced that this idea had been dropped, ostensibly due to viewer complaints that it was too pretentious. Henceforth Ancient Egyptian hieroglyphs (two reeds, lion, twisted flax, horned viper, water, and the eye of Horus) would be used instead. The show's opening sequence displayed Greek letters in the first episode of Series 4, but these were replaced with the hieroglyphs in subsequent episodes.

Series 1–6 had a straight round-robin "knockout" format, which was then modified to a double-elimination tournament, in a rule change that Coren Mitchell said that even she did not fully understand. Series 12–13 shifted to a format identical to University Challenge, with a knockout first round combined with a repechage for the best performing losers and double-elimination quarter-finals. The number of competing teams has fluctuated: 16 in series 1, 3–6, 10–11 and 14; 8 teams in series 2, 8 and 9; and 24 in series 12–13. The difficulty of questions generally increases by each round.

For Series 16 changes had to be made to the production of the show due to the COVID-19 pandemic and the new British government requirements and guidelines on television productions. For this new series, each team now sit at their desks socially distanced with perspex screens dividing the team members, with no huddled conferring permitted. For the connecting wall round, each team stands socially distanced apart, with perspex screens separating them, with only the team captain permitted to use the keyboard. These changes were kept in place for Series 17 and 18.

Round 1: Connections 
Teams are given up to four clues and must try to figure out the connection between them within 40 seconds. The team is initially shown one clue, and may request the remaining three clues at any time within the 40 seconds (they are not automatically shown). The team may press their buzzer to guess after the first clue for 5 points, the second for 3, the third for 2, or the fourth for 1. If the team guesses incorrectly, fails to answer after buzzing in a timely manner, or fails to buzz within the time allotted, the opposing team is shown any remaining clues and can answer for a bonus point. Play then alternates until each team has played three sets of clues. Typically, one of the six puzzles involves pictures, and another uses pieces of music, both classical and contemporary. Music questions are generally considered among the toughest questions in the quiz, and a team's dismay upon realising they have chosen the music question is a frequent source of humour on the programme.

Round 2: Sequences 
In this round, each set of four clues forms a sequence. Teams may see a maximum of three clues, and must determine what would come fourth in the sequence within the 40 second time limit. As with the first round, teams score points dependent on the number of clues seen and if they fail to guess correctly, it is thrown over to the other team, who can see any remaining clues and answer for a bonus point. Some sequences can have multiple acceptable answers (for example, if the sequence is sources of Vitamins A, B, C, and D, any source of Vitamin D would be an accepted answer), while others may only have one. Teams can score points without correctly identifying what the sequence is, but may be required to do so if the sequence is very specific or if they are providing a correct alternate sequence incorporating the three provided clues. As in the previous round, one set of clues involves pictures, with teams describing the fourth picture in the sequence, and starting from the quarterfinals of Series 10, there is occasionally a sequence made by three music clips, with contestants supplying the title or artist/s of the fourth unplayed music clip. 

For example, sequential clues of "Anger", "Bargaining" and "Depression" would be correctly followed by "Acceptance", these being the 2nd through 5th stages of the Kübler-Ross model of grief.

Round 3: Connecting Wall 

Each team receives a wall of 16 clues and are given 2 minutes and 30 seconds to sort them into four groups of four connected items. The puzzles are designed to include red herrings and to suggest more connections than actually exist, as some clues appear to fit into more than one category, but there is only one perfect solution for each wall. Teams create groups one at a time by tapping on four tiles on the touchscreen, and can make unlimited guesses before finding two complete groups. Once two groups have been identified, teams are only given three chances to identify the remaining two groups before the wall freezes, even if there is time remaining on the clock. 

Once all groups are found, time has expired, or all three lives are depleted, the team scores 1 point for each group found within 2 minutes 30 seconds, and any groups not found are shown. The team then scores 1 point for correctly identifying the connections even in the groups they failed to find. If a team finds all four groups and correctly identifies all four connections, they are awarded 2 bonus points, for a maximum total of 10 points. Unlike the previous rounds, the opposing team does not have the opportunity to score points from their opponents' wall. 

On 1 March 2010, an interactive online version of this round was put on the Only Connect website. From mid-2011, coinciding with series 5, the website took online submissions for new Connecting Walls; the online game was discontinued for series 10.

Round 4: Missing Vowels 
In a final buzzer round, the teams are presented with a series of word puzzles. The category of the puzzles is given before they are displayed, and each category contains a maximum of four puzzles. Each puzzle is a word or phrase with the vowels removed and the spaces shifted to disguise the original words. For example, in a category of "Booker Prize-winning novels", a puzzle of "VR NNGDLT TL" would be correctly answered as "Vernon God Little".

Teams answer simultaneously using buzzers, and score 1 point for each puzzle they solve. Initially there was no penalty for guessing incorrectly on this round, but starting with the quarter-finals in Series 1, teams have faced a penalty of 1 point for each incorrect answer. Additionally, if the team that buzzes provides an incorrect answer (even by a single letter) or fails to answer quickly, the opposing team is given an opportunity to answer for a bonus point.

The round lasts for between 90 seconds and three minutes. The team with the most points at the end of the game is the winner. If teams are tied, then a single sudden-death puzzle is given to the captains of each team. If a captain buzzes in first and gives the correct answer then their team wins, but an incorrect answer automatically forfeits the game. Although no category is officially given, they make reference to their own role as sudden-death questions. Examples are "So Long and Thanks for All the Fish", "To the Victor, the Spoils" and "Winner Stays On".

Champions and runners-up 
 Series 1 Champions: Crossworders (Mark Grant, David Stainer, Ian Bayley)
 Runners-Up: Lapsed Psychologists (Richard McDougall, Jack Waley-Cohen, Matthew Stevens)
 Series 2 Champions: Rugby Boys (Richard Parnell, Gary Dermody, Mark Labbett)
 Runners-Up: Cambridge Quiz Society (Paul Beecher, Simon Spiro, Joshua Karton)
 Series 3 Champions: Gamblers (Jenny Ryan, Dave Bill, Alan Gibbs)
 Runners-Up: Strategists (Chris Cummins, Michael Dnes, Sarah Higgins)
 Series 4 Champions: Epicureans (David Brewis, Katie Bramall-Stainer, Aaron Bell)
 Runners-Up: Radio Addicts (Dave Clark, Gary Grant, Neil Phillips)
 Series 5 Champions: Analysts (Paul Steeples, David Lea, William De Ath)
 Runners-Up: Antiquarians (Simon Belcher, Will Howells, Debbie Challis)
 Series 6 Champions: Scribes (Holly Pattenden, Dom Tait, Gareth Price)
 Runners-Up: Draughtsmen (Andy Tucker, Iwan Thomas, Steve Dodding)
 Series 7 Champions: Francophiles (Ian Clark, Mark Walton, Sam Goodyear)
 Runners-Up: Celts (Beverley Downes, Huw Pritchard, David Pritchard)
 Series 8 Champions: Board Gamers (Hywel Carver, Jamie Karran, Michael Wallace)
 Runners-Up: Bakers (Tim Spain, Peter Steggle, Matt Rowbotham)
 Series 9 Champions: Europhiles (Douglas Thomson, Mark Seager, Khuram Rashid)
 Runners-Up: Relatives (Hamish Galloway, Davina Galloway, Nick Latham)
 Series 10 Champions: Orienteers (Paul Beecher, Sean Blanchflower, Simon Spiro)
 Runners-Up: Chessmen (Henry Pertinez, Stephen Pearson, Nick Mills)
 Series 11 Champions: String Section (Tessa North, Richard Aubrey, Pete Sorel Cameron)
 Runners-Up: Wayfarers (Barbara Thompson, Gerard Mackay, Matt Beatson)
 Series 12 Champions: Verbivores (Phyl Styles, Graeme Cole, Tom Cappleman)
 Runners-Up: Cosmopolitans (Annette Fenner, Amy Godel, Emily Watnick)
 Series 13 Champions: Escapologists (Frank Paul, Lydia Mizon, Tom Rowell)
 Runners-Up: Belgophiles (Helen Fasham, Ben Fasham, Phil Small)
 Series 14 Champions: Dicers (George Corfield, Hugh Binnie, Joey Goldman)
 Runners-Up: Time Ladies (Charlotte Jackson, Rebecca Shaw, Emma Harris)
 Series 15 Champions: 007s (Frankie Fanko, Andrew Fanko, Andrew Beasley)
 Runners-Up: Suits (Kyle Lam, Toby Nonnenmacher, Isi Bogod)
 Series 16 Champions: Puzzle Hunters (Paul Taylor, Katie Steckles, Ali Lloyd)
 Runners-Up: Dungeon Masters (Charlie Deeks, Anna Hayfield, Sam Hayfield)
 Series 17 Champions: Data Wizards (Claire Turner, Tim Brown, Jonathan Cairns)
 Runners-Up: Golfers (Evan Lynch, Frances Clark-Murray, George Charlson)
 Series 18 Champions: Strigiformes (Jonathan Taylor, Jonathan Williams, Joshua Mutio)
 Runners-Up: Crustaceans (Dennis, Alex Hardwick, Elia Cugini)

Transmissions

Series

Specials

Notes

References

External links 
 
 
 
 

2008 British television series debuts
2000s British game shows
2010s British game shows
2020s British game shows
BBC television game shows
English-language television shows
Puzzle competitions
Television series by Banijay